Leandro Fahel Matos or simply Fahel  (born 15 August 1981 in Teófilo Otoni), is a Brazilian football coach and former player who played as a defensive midfielder.

He previously played for Atlético Paranaense and Botafogo.

Honours 
Botafogo
Taça Guanabara: 2009, 2010
Taça Rio: 2010
Campeonato Carioca: 2010

Bahia
Campeonato Baiano: 2012

References

External links
 lpfp.pt
 zerozero.pt
 playerhistory.com
 worldsoccerstats
 sambafoot
 CBF

1981 births
Living people
Brazilian footballers
Brazilian expatriate footballers
Expatriate footballers in Portugal
Goiás Esporte Clube players
Brazilian people of Arab descent
América Futebol Clube (MG) players
C.S. Marítimo players
Ipatinga Futebol Clube players
Cruzeiro Esporte Clube players
F.C. Paços de Ferreira players
S.C. Beira-Mar players
Club Athletico Paranaense players
Villa Rio Esporte Clube players
Botafogo de Futebol e Regatas players
Esporte Clube Bahia players
Paysandu Sport Club players
Campeonato Brasileiro Série A players
Campeonato Brasileiro Série B players
Primeira Liga players

Association football midfielders